The Government Degree College for Women, Sopore (Urdu;) commonly known as Women's College Sopore is a University of Kashmir affiliated autonomous women's degree college located at Sopore in Baramulla district in the Indian union territory of Jammu and Kashmir. The college is affiliated with University of Kashmir and is recognised by University Grants Commission of India under articles 2(f) and 12(B) of UGC Act, 1956.

Location
The college is located in Nowpora Kallan, Sopore. It is situated at a distance of about 3 km from main town Sopore, 17 km from district headquarter Baramulla and 49 km from state summer capital Srinagar.

Establishment
Government of Jammu and Kashmir established the college in the year 2005 during the Chief-Ministership of Mufti Mohammad Sayeed under Prime Minister of India's reconstruction plan.

Courses offered 
The college offers various bachelor courses in Arts and Science streams.

Bachelor courses 

 Bachelors in Arts
 Bachelors in Science (Medical)
 Bachelors in Science (Non-Medical)
 Bachelors of Computer Application (BCA)
 Home Science

References

Women's universities and colleges in Jammu and Kashmir
Degree colleges in Kashmir Division
Baramulla district
University of Kashmir
Educational institutions established in 2005
2005 establishments in Jammu and Kashmir